Lescure (in Occitan Era Escura) is a commune, located in the department of Ariège in the region of Occitanie, in southern France.

Its inhabitants are called Escurois.

Geography
Commune of the Pyrenees located in the urban area of Saint - Girons on the Baup . It is part of the Regional Natural Park of the Pyrenees ariégeoises .

Politics and Administration

Demographics

In 2014, the municipality had 501 inhabitants, a decrease of -1.18% compared with 2009 ( Ariège : 0.95%, France excluding Mayotte : 2.49%).

Places and monuments
The bell tower of Nogues of the thirteenth century is located on the road to Santiago de Compostela. Place currently preserved by the association "Les Amis du Clocher de Nogues". The remains of this ancient church were listed historic monument by decree of June 6, 2012  .

Personalities related to the commune
Robert Redeker (born 1954), philosopher and writer
Thierry Escaich (born 1965), organist and composer, born in Nogent-sur-Marne but part of the family of which is attached to Lescure.
Raoul Béteille (1924-2015), magistrate

See also
Communes of the Ariège department

References

Communes of Ariège (department)
Ariège communes articles needing translation from French Wikipedia